Baillif Airport  is an airport serving Basse Terre, a coastal city in Guadeloupe. The airport has high terrain north through southeast.

See also

Transport in Guadeloupe
List of airports in Guadeloupe

References

External links
Picture 03/2020
OpenStreetMap - Baillif
OurAirports - Baillif
SkyVector - Baillif
Bing Maps - Airports in Guadeloupe  Baillif